Gilles Gémise-Fareau (born 27 August 1953) is a French athlete. He competed in the men's decathlon at the 1976 Summer Olympics.

References

1953 births
Living people
Athletes (track and field) at the 1976 Summer Olympics
French decathletes
Olympic athletes of France
Place of birth missing (living people)